

Eastern Europe localities

 Druzhba (city), a city in Sumy Oblast, Ukraine
 Druzhba, Chernihiv Oblast, an urban-type settlement in Chernihiv Oblast, Ukraine
 Druzhba, Ternopil Oblast, an urban-type settlement in Ternopil Oblast, Ukraine
 Druzhba, Zhytomyr Oblast, an urban-type settlement in Zhytomyr Oblast, Ukraine
Druzhba, the Russian name of the city of Dostyk, Kazakhstan
Druzhba, Vidin Province, a village in Vidin Province, Bulgaria
Druzhba, Russia, the name of several rural localities in Russia
Hotel Družba in Prague

Other uses
1621 Druzhba, an asteroid
Druzhba pipeline, the world's longest oil pipeline stretching from Central Russia to Central Europe
Druzhba (ship)
Druzhba-84 or Druzhba Games or Friendship Games, an international multisport event that was held in 1984 in nine different countries
Druzhba (brand), a Russian chainsaw brand
Druzhba-78, a former ice hockey team based in Kharkiv, Ukraine.